Technip Energies N.V. is a French engineering and technology company for the energy industry and chemicals sector. It is a spin-off of TechnipFMC.

History 
Technip Energies was established in 2021 as a spinoff of multinational energy company TechnipFMC, itself the result of a merger between French group Technip and American company FMC Technologies. In August 2019, TechnipFMC CEO Doug Pferdehirt announced that TechnipFMC would be split into two independent engineering companies: a dedicated technology and services company, to retain the TechnipFMC name, and an engineering and construction business renamed Technip Energies. In January 2021, Technip Energies CEO Arnaud Piéton announced plans for an initial public offering and committed to demonstrate to shareholders that the organization could operate independently of TechnipFMC. The TechnipFMC spilt became effective the following month. The spinoff was completed on 12 February 2021.

Activities 
Technip Energies, unlike TechnipFMC, will not focus on upstream - oil exploration and production - development projects, but instead largely on design and construction of large-scale projects to liquify and ship natural gas, as well as refinery bio-conversion projects, carbon capture, and hydrogen.

Gas, especially liquefied natural gas (LNG), provides over 60% of Technip Energies’ turnover, while refining and petrochemicals together provide 25-30%. Technip Energies is the world leader in the construction of LNG factories. Technip Energies is also a world leader in hydrogen, having participated in the construction of 30% of the currently installed production capacities. 

As at December 2021, the company operated in 34 countries with 15,000 employees.

Technip Energies has been the main contractor on the Yamal LNG development, a US$27 billion project designed to ship LNG to Asian markets through the Northeast Passage. In March 2022, Technip Energies renounced new business opportunities in Russia following its invasion of Ukraine. In April 2022, the European Union's fifth package of sanctions against Russia barred the delivery of goods and technologies required for gas liquefaction, putting a pause on Technip Energies' Arctic LNG 2 liquefied natural gas project. In October 2022, Arnaud Pieton announced having signed an Exit Framework Agreement for this project and anticipated completing this process within the first half of 2023.

In February 2021, QatarEnergy awarded a $13 billion contract to Technip Energies and its Japanese partner Chiyoda. The project involves the construction of four natural gas liquefaction plants in Qatar to increase the country's liquefied natural gas production by 40%. The contract sent Technip Energies stock price soaring on its first day of trading, associating it with the largest LNG project in history. 

In 2021, Technip Energies supplied the world’s first liquefied CO2 marine loading arms as part of the Northern Lights carbon capture project in Norway. In July 2022, Hafslund Oslo Celsio awarded Technip Energies a contract for the world’s first complete waste-to-energy facility with CO2 capture.

In 2022, Technip Energies collaborated with the Swiss sports brand On to develop the first ever shoe made using carbon emissions as a primary raw material.

In July 2022, Technip Energies signed an agreement with the UAE’s National Petroleum Construction Co. (NPCC) to form the joint venture NT ENERGIES LLC, which aims to support the energy transition in the Middle East and North Africa by offering services related to decarbonization and blue and green hydrogen.

Technip Energies was part of the consortium which launched the Alliance for Industry Decarbonization, which aims to decarbonize industrial value chains towards the Paris Agreement goals. 

Technip Energies is a member of OPEN-C Foundation, a foundation dedicated to floating wind power and marine renewable energies.

Technip Energies is listed on the Euronext Paris stock market with symbol TE, and on the American over-the-counter market as American Depositary Receipt TKPPK.

References

Companies listed on Euronext Paris
Construction and civil engineering companies established in 2021
Construction and civil engineering companies of France
Corporate spin-offs
Energy companies of France
French companies established in 2021
Nanterre
Oil and gas companies of France
Oilfield services companies